Stuart Campbell McDonald (born 2 May 1978) is a Scottish National Party (SNP) politician. He has been the Member of Parliament (MP) for the Cumbernauld, Kilsyth and Kirkintilloch East constituency since 2015. A member of the House of Commons Home Affairs Select Committee, he has served as the SNP Spokesperson for Justice and Immigration since 10 December 2022. He served as the SNP Shadow Home Secretary from 2021 to 2022. He was the SNP Spokesperson on Immigration, Asylum and Border Control from 2015 to 2021.

He was first elected at the general election in May 2015, unseating incumbent Labour MP and Shadow Pensions Minister, Gregg McClymont.  McDonald is the first SNP MP to represent Cumbernauld, Kilsyth and Kirkintilloch East (Margaret Bain was MP for Dumbartonshire East which covered Cumbernauld in the early-1970s), which covers parts of the North Lanarkshire and East Dunbartonshire council areas.

Early life and career before politics
Raised in Milton of Campsie, McDonald attended Kilsyth Academy between 1990 and 1996. He studied at the University of Edinburgh between 1996 and 2001, where he graduated from with a 2:1 Bachelor of Law (Hons), and a Diploma in Legal Practice. During his time at the University of Edinburgh, McDonald studied European and Comparative Law while on an ERASMUS year at the University of Leuven, between 1997 and 1998.

After graduating from university, McDonald worked as a Legal Trainee with Simpson and Marwick Solicitors, between October 2001 and July 2003, before he went to work for NHS Scotland's Central Legal Office, as a Solicitor – a position he held between July 2003 and November 2005. In November 2005, McDonald began working for the Immigration Advisory Service (IAS), as a Human Rights Solicitor – a job he held until November 2009, when he became a Senior Researcher at the Scottish Parliament.

He left his position at the Scottish Parliament in February 2013, to become a Senior Researcher for the pro-independence Scottish independence referendum campaign Yes Scotland, a position he held until the independence referendum on 18 September 2014. Immediately prior to his election, McDonald worked as a Parliamentary and Public Affairs Officer for the Coalition for Racial Equality and Rights, a Glasgow-based charity.

Member of Parliament (2015–present)
McDonald was officially selected unopposed as the SNP candidate, in December 2014, for the constituency which he has described as his "home patch". He went on to win Cumbernauld, Kilsyth and Kirkintilloch East in the 2015 UK Parliamentary Election with 59.9% of the vote, and a majority of 14,752.

Following his election, McDonald became the SNP's Spokesperson on Immigration, Asylum and Border Control, building on his previous experience as an immigration lawyer.

McDonald is gay and, on 19 May 2015, gathered with other LGBT SNP MPs, including his near-namesake Stewart McDonald, to campaign for a Yes vote in the Irish referendum on same-sex marriage, being held 3 days later.

McDonald is a Vice-Chair of the All-Party Parliamentary Group for Choice at the End of Life.

References

External links

 profile on SNP website
 

All-Party Parliamentary Group for Choice at the End of Life

1978 births
Living people
Alumni of the University of Edinburgh School of Law
Gay politicians
LGBT members of the Parliament of the United Kingdom
Scottish LGBT politicians
Members of the Parliament of the United Kingdom for Scottish constituencies
People from Milton of Campsie
Scottish National Party MPs
Scottish solicitors
UK MPs 2015–2017
UK MPs 2017–2019
UK MPs 2019–present
Politicians from East Dunbartonshire